Diamond Island is a small islet belonging to Grenada in the Grenadines archipelago of the Lesser Antilles, part of the Caribbean. The island is located between the larger islands of Grenada to the southwest and Carriacou to the northeast, and is found immediately north of Ronde Island.

See also
List of Caribbean islands

Islands of Grenada